Douglas M. Stone is a Major General, United States Marine Forces Reserve, Retired.  He relinquished in 2008 the position of Deputy Commanding General, Detainee Operations, Multi-National Force-Iraq and Commander, Task Force 134, commanding all detention operations at Camp Cropper, Camp Bucca and Camp Ashraf.  He was nominated for Lieutenant General and was to be head of Marine Forces Reserve and Marine Forces North.

Military career

Active duty
MG Stone was commissioned a second lieutenant in the Marine Corps after graduating from the United States Naval Academy in 1973.  He served on active duty until 1978 holding positions of Weapons Platoon Commander, Company Executive Officer, and Battalion Assistant Operations Officer and Commanding Officer, Company A, Marine Barracks, Guam.

Reserve

Assignments
In 1978, MG Stone accepted a reserve commission; and over the years served in the following positions:

Commanding Officer, Company B, 3rd Battalion, 23rd Marine Regiment
Commanding Officer, Headquarters Company, 23rd Marine Regiment
Operations Officer 2nd Battalion, 23rd Marine Regiment
Battalion Commander 2nd Battalion 23rd Marine Regiment
Deputy Commander, Marine Augmentation Command Element, I Marine Expeditionary Force, Camp Pendleton, California
Marine Officer in Charge, Executive Support Center, Office of the Secretary of Defense (Joint Staff)
Commanding General, Marine Corps Mobilization Command
Deputy Commanding General, Marine Corps Combat Development Command (Mob)
Commanding General, Marine Air Ground Task Force Training Command and Marine Corps Air Ground Combat Center

Most recently Stone commanded detention facilities in Iraq, where his reforms were widely admired.
Stone changed the structure of the detention, to more quickly expedite the release of captives who weren't enemies, or whose ties to the militants had been based on money, not ideology. In addition Stone changed how those held in detention were treated, allowing them visits from their family, and meaningful job skills training.

In April 2009 General David Petraeus called upon Stone to apply his successful experience from Iraq to study the USA's policy on detaining captives apprehended in Afghanistan.
His 700-page report was finished in August 2009, and Stone briefed senior officials including: Secretary of State Hillary Clinton, Richard Holbrooke (President Barack Obama's Special Envoy for the region), and General Stanley McChrystal, commander of U.S. forces in Afghanistan.
National Public Radio reports that while his report has not yet been made public officials briefed by him say he recommends releasing most Afghan captives, many of whom were not militants, just individuals rounded up in random sweeps.  He is also reported to have recommended that those the USA does detain receive the same kind of rehabilitation the captives whose detention he supervised in Iraq received.

According to Radio Free Europe, Amnesty International's Asia-Pacific director, Sam Zia Zarifi, paraphrased Stone's report on the USA's detentions in Afghanistan: "pointed out that the lack of a legal structure for Bagram means that it is undermining the rule of law in Afghanistan and it has caused a lot of resentment among Afghans."

Activations
Prior to being activated for Operation Iraqi Freedom, MG Stone had been activated once previously.  He was activated and served with the 2nd Battalion, 23rd Marine Regiment in support of Operation Desert Shield and Operation Desert Storm.  The Battalion, as part of its deployment to Okinawa was sent to Japan as MAGTF 4-91 supporting contingency and humanitarian relief operations in the Western Pacific.  From May 2003 to August 2004 he served as the U.S. Defense Representative (and CENTCOM Liaison Officer) in Islamabad, Pakistan.

Special positions
MG Stone has served on the USMC Reserve Policy Board, the Board of Directors for the Toys for Tots Foundation, and on the Board of Advisors to the Naval Postgraduate School.

Awards and honors
 

MajGen Stone was an honor graduate at Army Ranger School. He also holds several awards of the Rifle and Pistol Expert badges.

Civilian career
Following his distinguished military career and shortly after retirement, Dr. Stone founded STAC Solutions, a Service Disabled Veteran Owned Small Business (SDVOSB) in October 2012.  STAC Solutions provides Security, Telecommunications, Analytic, and Computing (STAC) Solutions primarily to the US Government.  The company has projects providing services directly and through top tier federal integrators to the Legislative Branch, Department of State, Department of Homeland Security, and consults for The United Nations and the US Department of Defense.  STAC has expanded its customer base and offerings since its inception and has enjoyed continual revenue growth.

Education
In addition to earning his Bachelor of Science Degree from the United States Naval Academy, he earned advanced degrees from Pepperdine University, Stanford University and the Naval War College.  He earned a doctorate in Public Administration from the University of Southern California.

See also

Unknown

References

External links
 STAC Solutions
Detainee ops commander visits 402nd TF Outlaw, Fort Bliss Monitor
General Officer Announcements, Department of Defense Public Affairs News Release
Scared Straight: Iraqi Style, Newsweek
Children doing battle in Iraq, Los Angeles Times
Juvenile detainees gain second chance through Dar Al-Hikmah, MNFI Press Release

Year of birth missing (living people)
Living people
United States Marine Corps personnel of the Iraq War
People from El Dorado County, California
United States Marine Corps generals
United States Marine Corps reservists
Recipients of the Legion of Merit
United States Naval Academy alumni
Pepperdine University alumni
Stanford University alumni
Naval War College alumni
USC Sol Price School of Public Policy alumni
Recipients of the Defense Superior Service Medal
United States Marine Corps personnel of the Vietnam War